Bras d'Or is a community in the Canadian province of Nova Scotia, located in the Cape Breton Regional Municipality.

Demographics 

References

  Bras d'Or on Destination Nova Scotia

Communities in the Cape Breton Regional Municipality
Designated places in Nova Scotia
General Service Areas in Nova Scotia